Ussher's flycatcher (Muscicapa ussheri) is a species of bird in the family Muscicapidae.  It is found in Ivory Coast, Ghana, Guinea, Guinea-Bissau, Liberia, Nigeria, and Sierra Leone.  Its natural habitats are subtropical or tropical dry forests and subtropical or tropical moist lowland forests.

References

Ussher's flycatcher
Birds of West Africa
Ussher's flycatcher
Taxonomy articles created by Polbot
Taxobox binomials not recognized by IUCN